Mayor of Camden, New Jersey, has been an office since its inception in 1828.

List of mayors 
 Victor Carstarphen (2021–present)
 Curtis Jenkins (interim) (2021)
Frank Moran (2018–2021)
Dana Redd (2010–2018)
Gwendolyn Faison (2000–2010)
Milton Milan (1997–2000). Milton Milan was the third mayor of Camden to be indicted for corruption within the past 20 years.
Arnold Webster (1993–1997). Arnold Webster was the second mayor of Camden to be indicted for corruption. He "pleaded guilty to federal wire fraud charges in 1998".
Aaron Thompson (1990–1993)
Melvin R. Primas, Jr. (1981–1990)
Angelo Errichetti (1973–1981). Angelo Errichetti was the first mayor of Camden to be indicted for corruption. He was indicted following Abscam.
 Joseph M. Nardi, Jr. (1969–1973)
 Alfred R. Pierce (1959–1969)
George Edward Brunner (1936–1959)
 Frederick von Nieda (1935–1936)
 Roy R. Stewart (1931–1935)
 Winfield S. Price (1927–1931)
Victor King (1923–1927)
Frank S. Van Hart, acting (1922–1923)
Charles H. Ellis (1905–1922)
Joseph E. Nowrey (1902–1905)
Cooper B. Hatch (1898–1902)
 L. Wescott (1892–1898)
 Jesse W. Pratt (1886–1892)
Claudius W. Bradshaw (1880–1886)
 James W. Ayers (1877–1880)
 John Morgan (1876–1877)
 John H. Jones (1874–1876)
 Samuel M. Gaul (1871–1874)
 Charles Cox (1867–1871)
 Paul C. Budd (1864–1867)
 Timothy Middleton (1863–1864)
 Paul C. Budd (1862–1863)
 Thomas B. Atkinson (1860–1862)
 Clayton Trueax (1858–1860)
 Benjamin A. Hammel (1857–1858)
 James W. Shroff (1856–1857)
 Samuel Scull (1855–1856)
 Lorenzo F. Fisler (1853–1855)
 Charles D. Hineline (1852–1853)
 Lorenzo F. Fisler (1851–1852)
 Charles Sexton (1849–1851)
 Benjamin A. Hammell (1848–1849)
 Thomas B. Wood (1846–1848)
 Charles Kaighn (1845–1846)
 Richard W. Howell (1845–1846)
 John F. Cowperthwaite	(1844–1845)
 Lorenzo F. Fisler (1840–1844)
 Elias Kaighn (1838–1840)
 Gideon V. Stivers (1830–1838)
 Samuel Laning (1828–1830).  Samuel Laning was the first Mayor of Camden, New Jersey.

References

 
1828 establishments in New Jersey
Camden